Cameron Carr (1876–1944) was an English actor of the silent era.

Selected filmography
 The Woman Wins (1918)
 Nature's Gentleman (1918)
 A Great Coup (1919)
 The Soul of Guilda Lois (1919)
 A Daughter of Eve (1919)
 The Gentleman Rider (1919)
 Under Suspicion (1919)
 Trent's Last Case (1920)
 Her Son (1920)
 The Romance of a Movie Star (1920)
 A Rank Outsider (1920)
 The Imperfect Lover (1921)
 The Penniless Millionaire (1921)
 The Loudwater Mystery (1921)
 Fox Farm (1922)
 A Maid of the Silver Sea (1922)
 Boy Woodburn (1922)
 The Scarlet Lady (1922)
 Son of Kissing Cup (1922)
 The Uninvited Guest (1923)
 Out to Win (1923)
 The Stirrup Cup Sensation  (1924)
 The Gay Corinthian (1924)
 The Great Well (1924)
 The Notorious Mrs. Carrick (1924)
 The House of Marney (1926)
 Poppies of Flanders (1927)
 The Rolling Road (1927)
 The Blue Peter (1928)
 The W Plan (1930)
 On Thin Ice (1933)

References

External links

1876 births
1944 deaths
Male actors from Surrey
English male film actors
English male silent film actors
20th-century English male actors
People from Kingston upon Thames